Star TV is a Tanzanian television station with a wide range of broadcast content.  It is based in Mwanza, near Lake Victoria, and maintains offices in Dar es Salaam.

See also
 Media of Tanzania

References

External links
 Star TV Official Web Site
 
 
 

Television stations in Tanzania
Mass media in Mwanza